Ouad Amour  or Ouad Emour is a village and rural commune in the Brakna Region of southern Mauritania.

In 2000 it had a population of 10,419.

References

Communes of Brakna Region